Karnataka Power Corporation Limited (or KPCL) is a company owned by the government of Karnataka, and is engaged in the Service of generating electrical power in the state of Karnataka in India. The modes for generation of electric power are hydroelectric, thermal, diesel, gas, wind and solar. The company was started on 20.07.1970 due to a vision of the Karnataka government for separate entities for generation and distribution of electric power. This was done, long before world bank dictated power sector reforms were initiated in early 21st century in India.
Karnataka Power Corporation Limited began its journey with a humble beginning in 1970. With an installed capacity of 746 MW (1970), it has expanded its capacity to 8738.305 MW (2019). A revenue of Rs.77442 Million in 2019 as compared, to Rs.1.30 Million in 1971, speaks volumes about KPCL's progress.

Power projects in Karnataka

KPCL has 34 dams (including the main, pickup and saddle dams) and 24 power stations across the state with power production capabilities ranging from 0.35 MW to 1035 MW. The hydroelectric projects of Karnataka Power Corporation Limited are built mainly across rivers Kaveri (Cauvery), Sharavathi, Kali, Krishna, Tungabhadra and their tributaries. The total installed capacity of KPCL is 8846.305 MW. The corporation has its thermal power station at Raichur And two more thermal project at Bellary of 500 MW station. The installed capacity of the thermal power station is 1720 MW (210 MW ×7units+1x250MW) at Raichur and 1700MW (2x500MW+1x700MW) at Bellary. The total gross power generation per annum is in the order of 10,362 GW·h at a plant load factor (PLF) 80% and 11,589 GW·h at a plant load factor of 90%.
The corporation, in order to increase generation, has planned one moreadditional units in Bellary of 1x700MW,  The corporation has Yermarus Thermal Power Station under construction at Yermarus, Raichur of capacity, with two units of 800MW each.

Installed capacity

The power stations of Karnataka are:

See also

KPTCL
MESCOM
BESCOM
GESCOM
HESCOM
CESCOM
PCKL
KERC

References

External links
Official site

Electric-generation companies of India
Energy in Karnataka
State agencies of Karnataka
State electricity agencies of India
Energy companies established in 1970
Non-renewable resource companies established in 1970
Indian companies established in 1970
1970 establishments in Mysore State
1035
Nagjhari	Hydel	6	150	900
Varahi River	Hydel	4	115	460
Almatti Dam	Hydel	5 + 1	5x55 + 1x15	290
Gerusoppa	Hydel	4	60	240
Kadra Dam	Hydel	3	50	150
Kodasalli Dam	Hydel	3	40	120
Supa Dam	Hydel	2	50	100